A guest comic (or guest strip) is an issue of a comic strip that is created by a different person (or people) than usual. The practice is especially common in webcomics.

Guest comics in webcomics
Guest comics are usually requested of other artists by the usual creator of a webcomic. This may be done for a variety of reasons:
 The creators are friends.
 The usual creator will be unable to update the comic for some length of time, so they use guest comics to fill in the gap.
 The usual creator enjoys (or thinks the audience will enjoy) seeing how other artists draw their characters.
 A major phase of the plot has ended and the creator wants to take a break but keep the audience entertained.
Guest comics are usually not meant to be canonical with the normal comic; their purpose is primarily entertainment.

Sometimes, guest comics are not published as if they were regular comics, but instead exhibited on the comic's website in a separate section; e.g. White Ninja Comics. Webcomic creators that are in the same webcomic syndicate (e.g. Dayfree Press) frequently do guest comics for each other, sometimes simultaneously.

Webcomics